Tolpia is a genus of moths of the family Erebidae erected by Francis Walker in 1863. The genus used to be included in the family Noctuidae.

Species
The odor species group
 Tolpia odor Fibiger, 2007
 Tolpia fyani Fibiger, 2007
The unguis species group
 Tolpia sikkimi Fibiger, 2007
 Tolpia unguis Fibiger, 2007
 Tolpia buthani Fibiger, 2007
 Tolpia indiai Fibiger, 2007
 Tolpia andamani Fibiger, 2007
 Tolpia hainanensis Fibiger, 2010
 Tolpia paraunguis Fibiger, 2010
 Tolpia mons Fibiger, 2010
The peniculus species group
 Tolpia peniculus Fibiger, 2007
 Tolpia kampungi Fibiger, 2007
 Tolpia multiprocessa Fibiger, 2008
The conscitulana species group
 Tolpia orientis Fibiger, 2007
 Tolpia alexmadseni Fibiger, 2007
 Tolpia talauti Fibiger, 2007
 Tolpia palawani Fibiger, 2007
 Tolpia conscitulana Walker, 1863
The crispus species group
 Tolpia crispus Fibiger, 2007
 Tolpia knudlarseni Fibiger, 2007
The montana species group
 Tolpia montana Fibiger, 2007
 Tolpia sarawakia Fibiger, 2007
 Tolpia parasarawakia Fibiger, 2007
 Tolpia kuchingia Fibiger, 2007
 Tolpia kalimantania Fibiger, 2011
The mccabei species group
 Tolpia mccabei Fibiger, 2007

Former species
 Tolpia myops Hampson, 1907

References

Micronoctuini
Noctuoidea genera